The Penguins of Madagascar is an American computer-animated television series co-produced by DreamWorks Animation and Nickelodeon. It stars nine characters from DreamWorks' animated film Madagascar: the penguins Skipper (Tom McGrath), Rico (John DiMaggio), Kowalski (Jeff Bennett), and Private (James Patrick Stuart); the lemurs King Julien (Danny Jacobs), Maurice (Kevin Michael Richardson), and Mort (Andy Richter); and Mason (Conrad Vernon) and Phil the chimpanzees. Characters new to the series include Marlene the otter (Nicole Sullivan) and a zookeeper named Alice (Mary Scheer). It is the first Nicktoon co-produced with DreamWorks Animation. The series was executive-produced by Bob Schooley and Mark McCorkle, who were the creators of the animated series Buzz Lightyear of Star Command (a spin-off of Pixar's Toy Story franchise) and Disney Channel's Kim Possible.

The pilot episode, "Gone in a Flash", aired as part of "Superstuffed Nicktoons Weekend" on Friday, November 28, 2008, and The Penguins of Madagascar became a regular series on March 28, 2009. The series premiere drew 6.1 million viewers, setting a new record as the most-watched premiere.

Although the series occasionally alludes to the rest of the franchise, The Penguins of Madagascar does not take place at a precise time within it. McGrath, who is also the co-creator of the film characters, has said that the series takes place "not specifically before or after the movie, I just wanted them all back at the zoo. I think of it as taking place in a parallel universe".

At the end of 2010, the show was the number two animated program on television among kids age 2–11 and in basic cable total viewers. The show received praise for its animation quality, regarded as very good for the time.

In December 2014, DiMaggio stated that the show ended production. The show's executive producers, Mark McCorkle and Bob Schooley, later served as executive consultants for DreamWorks' next Madagascar spin-off series (All Hail King Julien).

Plot 
The Penguins of Madagascar is a spin-off of the Madagascar films. The series follows the adventures of four penguins: Skipper, Kowalski, Rico, and Private, who perform various commando-like missions to protect their home in the Central Park Zoo. The penguins often have to deal with problems caused, or made worse, by their zoo neighbors, King Julien XIII (a ring-tailed lemur), Maurice (an aye-aye), and Mort (a mouse lemur).

Episodes

Characters 

The Penguins of Madagascar features the four penguin characters from the Madagascar franchise, as well as the two chimpanzees and the two lemurs and aye-aye. Characters new to the franchise include Marlene the otter and Alice the zookeeper, among others. Tom McGrath, John DiMaggio, Andy Richter, and Conrad Vernon reprise their roles as Skipper, Rico, Mort, and Mason respectively.

All four of the penguin characters are designed differently in the cartoon than they are in the movie to make them more distinguishable and easier to tell apart. Skipper's head is flatter in the series; Kowalski is taller; Rico has an unexplained scar over his mouth, a double chin, and a feathery Mohawk; and Private is shorter, younger, and rounder. Their personalities and abilities were also exaggerated. The texture of the characters was also changed to be better suited for television work.

Main 

 Skipper (voiced by Tom McGrath) is the leader of the penguins. He devises tactics and gives orders. Calculating, strict, energetic, paranoid, short-tempered and nearly unflappable, Skipper's raving paranoia and tendency to view even the most ordinary activities as a military operation, combined with his experience in covert ops, has driven him to prepare for nearly any situation, no matter how bizarre or unlikely. It is revealed in the episode "Needle Point" that Skipper is afraid of needles. McGrath reprises his role from the films.
 Kowalski (voiced by Jeff Bennett) acts as the group strategist and gadgeteer. Kowalski is a brilliant inventor, but he cannot read (although he does carry around a clipboard upon which he records drawings of their plans). He also tends to over-analyze situations and has created many amazing devices which have put the team in danger. It is revealed in the episode "Needle Point" that he is afraid of going to the dentist.
 Rico (voiced by John DiMaggio) is the team's weapons and explosives specialist, who mainly communicates through grunts and squeals, but sometimes he can speak rather normally. Slightly unhinged, Rico swallows useful tools, such as dynamite, and regurgitates them when needed, to the point of regularly regurgitating objects that appear to be too large for him to have swallowed in the first place. He has been referred to as a psychopath in several episodes. He is shown in some episodes to be in a relationship with a female doll called Miss Perky. DiMaggio reprises his role from the films. 
 Private (voiced by James Patrick Stuart) is the emotionally sensitive, English-accented rookie of the group. Though younger and less experienced than the other penguins, he is the most down to earth; Private tends to offer simpler, more commonsense solutions in response to Skipper and Kowalski's complex strategies, often in an understated tone while those strategies are falling apart (e.g., "The Officer X Factor"). He often shows an eager interest in unicorns, as evidenced by his love of a show called "The Lunacorns" (e.g., "Hello, Dollface", "Operation: Lunacorn Apocalypse"), for which he is often ridiculed. Private is also a skilled fighter.
 King Julien XIII (voiced by Danny Jacobs) – Normally shortened to King Julien, King Julien XIII is a fun loving, witty, narcissistic ring-tailed lemur. The King of the Lemurs is a comically conceited character who has little regard for others, even his subjects. He has a tendency to use malapropisms and misinterpret figures of speech. King Julien considers himself to be king over all animals he encounters, but is oblivious to their dislike of him. He is very lazy, childish, immature, dimwitted, and spoiled to the point where he will not offer assistance to ensure his own safety. He is also very proud of his bottom, which he refers to as "The Royal Booty".
 Maurice (voiced by Kevin Michael Richardson) is an aye-aye who is one of King Julien's subjects. Maurice accepts his life as a servant, but he often shows disdain towards King Julien and his inconsiderate attitude. He seems to be aware of human activities and inventions, even though he has spent most of his life away from human civilization.
Mort (voiced by Andy Richter) is an excitable, dimwitted, accident-prone mouse lemur. Unlike Maurice, Mort is fiercely devoted to Julien, even displaying an obsession with the lemur king's feet. King Julien treats him with contempt. He is considered to be the cutest animal in the zoo, which upsets Private. Mort is occasionally enlisted to help the penguins due to his small size or cuteness. Richter reprises his role from the films.
 Mason (voiced by Conrad Vernon) and Phil are two intelligent chimpanzees. Mason can speak and is very civilized and refined. Phil is mute, but is the only animal in the zoo that can read. Phil is often asked to read something, and then he communicates the message to Mason through sign language which is interpreted by Mason. Different episodes indicate that they are highly intelligent, but they are not openly aware of this themselves. Phil is considered for involvement with a space exploration program. Vernon reprises his role from the films.
 Marlene (voiced by Nicole Sullivan; Dee Bradley Baker in wild form) is a female otter who was transferred to the Central Park Zoo from the Monterey Bay Aquarium. She is close friends with Skipper and sometimes tags along on his missions, but she is often a neutral character who does not take sides between the penguins and the lemurs. By being a levelheaded, feminine voice of reason, she is a counterpoint to Skipper's masculine, covert-ops character. Since she was born in captivity, once she sets out of the confines of the zoo, she goes wild as she cannot cope with the lack of boundaries. Later after Kowalski separated her wild side, she becomes afraid as her feral side roams over the city. The penguins later put the two Marlenes back together and Marlene is able to control her wild side. In "Popcorn Panic", a brief shot of the zoo map reveals her enclosure to be that of an "Asian Otter".

Recurring 
 Roger (voiced by Richard Kind) is the penguins' alligator friend who lives in the sewer. They meet him in the episode "Haunted Habitat" when Skipper and Marlene go to investigate in the sewer under Marlene's habitat because of a strange sound. Roger tells the penguins that he is from Florida. He appears again in "Roger Dodger" when the sewer rats terrorize him and in "Gator Watch" when he wants a new home, eventually being captured and sent to the zoo.
 Max / "Moon-cat" (voiced by Wayne Knight) is the penguins' stray cat friend. He first meets the four penguins in the episode "Launchtime" when the penguins end up on a rooftop across the street from the zoo instead of on the moon. At first, the penguins thought he was a "moon-cat" but at the end they figure out he was a stray cat, but they still refer to Max as "Moon-cat" out of habit. Max is skinny and hopes to catch a bird in his life. He at first wanted to eat the penguins, but was so touched when they gave him a can of fish that he became their friend instead. He appeared again in "Cat's Cradle", in which he tried to hide from Officer X from Animal Control.
 Joey (voiced by James Patrick Stuart) is an anti-social kangaroo with a passion for boxing. He is extremely possessive of his habitat. Most of his comments refer to physically hurting the subject of discussion. He speaks with an Australian accent.
 Bada and Bing (voiced by John DiMaggio and Kevin Michael Richardson) are two gorillas who enjoy fighting. They once beat up Mort, which led to Mort growing after he was thrown into Kowalski's latest invention, and they then got beat up by Mort to get a mango. Julien once gave them many bananas but it is possible that they beat him up due to him giving too much to them. They are occasionally used as bodyguards to various characters, specifically anyone claiming to be the king. Some episodes suggest that the penguins are afraid of the gorillas due to their power, but these are outnumbered by episodes in which the penguins easily beat them, typically without provocation. They also tend to play up the stereotype of Italian-American mobsters.
 Fred (voiced by Fred Stoller) is a squirrel that takes everything said literally and has a slow monotone speech pattern. Fred lives in a park near the zoo. He dated Marlene in "Otter Things Have Happened", but she broke up with him. He does not get excited about much, and consistently seems unhappy.
 Burt (voiced by John DiMaggio) is an Indian elephant who was just one of the extra animals during the beginning of the series, but then he evolved into a character later on and even got a central episode in "An Elephant Never Forgets". He is shown to be obsessed with peanuts.
 Manfredi and Johnson (voiced by James Patrick Stuart and Danny Jacobs) are two unseen recruits, referenced mainly by Skipper, who have suffered horrible, seemingly fatal ("You know, one up there and one down there!" – Skipper) events in a number of previous penguin missions. Their "fates" have included having been attacked by "flying piranhas", their remains later ladled into their graves with a teaspoon; having been short one escape tunnel, their remains later sent back in a manila envelope, coincidentally from Manila; having mistaken the "business end" of a beluga whale for an underwater escape tunnel, resulting in them not being able to speak for a month; having fallen for the "exploding elephant foot trick"; a Chinese lantern and six bottles of rocket fuel for a talent show; having lost their hearts, a lung, and 15 feet of intestine when they fell in love with two chinstrap sisters; and being apparently literally smothered when a message informing the others to smother them with affection was misinterpreted. The two make a brief appearance – alive – in the episode "The Penguin Who Loved Me". "Manfredi" and "Johnson" are also the names of the two American POWs killed while trying to escape the German prison camp in the 1953 movie Stalag 17.
 Eggy (voiced by Tara Strong) is a duckling who the penguins once "egg-sitted" in "Paternal Egg-Stinct". In the episode "Hard Boiled Eggy", the penguins learn that because they influenced him while inside the egg, Eggy had all their commando strengths combined. At the end of the episode, Julien teaches Eggy how to dance and Eggy finds such better than trying to be a penguin.
 Alice (voiced by Mary Scheer) is a surly zookeeper, who regularly expresses disinterest in her job. Though another worker can sometimes be heard on her walkie-talkie, and seen working around the zoo, his face is never seen.
 The Vesuvius Twins (voiced by Atticus Shaffer) are two schoolboys from a very wealthy family. They are disliked by all of the animals of the zoo because of how nasty they are. Even though they are repeatedly banned from going near the animals, they usually get around the ban because of their parent's wealth, e.g. purchasing all of the tickets for an event at the zoo. Private often encourages others to show kindness to the boys, choosing to believe that they are secretly good.
 Dr. Blowhole (voiced by Neil Patrick Harris) is Skipper's archenemy. He is an evil bottlenose dolphin scientist and supervillain, who has red lobsters as minions. He was mentioned in the episodes "Eclipsed" and "Roomies", but he makes a full appearance in the special "Dr. Blowhole's Revenge". Doctor Blowhole makes another full appearance in "The Return of the Revenge of Doctor Blowhole", where he uses his "Mind Jacker" and "Diaboligizer" to take over Central Park Zoo, but transforms Julian's Mp3 player into a giant "music monster". In "The Penguin Who Loved Me" (a sequel episode to "The Return of the Revenge of Doctor Blowhole"), having had his memory erased by his own Mind Jacker, Blowhole remembers himself as Flippy, "Seaville's second most popular performer". He recalls nothing of the penguins or his evil self. In this episode, his real name is revealed to be Francis, and he has a sister named Doris. Blowhole rides on a Segway-type vehicle as his means of transportation on land. Four running gags are that his skin is "surprisingly pleasant to the touch", that he constantly mispronounces "penguins" as "peng-u-ins", that he calls the penguins "flightless", and that he constantly rubs in the fact that he has far more superior technology than the penguins do.
 Hans (voiced by John DiMaggio) is a devious puffin with a history with Skipper that involves a mission in Denmark that somehow resulted in Skipper being declared Public Enemy Number One in the country in question. During "Huffin & Puffin", he appeared in New York, initially apparently wanting to make peace with Skipper, before his true agenda was revealed to be his attempt to take control of the penguins' lair for revenge. With Skipper having infiltrated the lair and defeated Hans, he was then shipped to the Hoboken Zoo. He appeared in "The Return of the Revenge of Doctor Blowhole", working with Doctor Blowhole as part of a plan to take Skipper's memories.
 The Rat King (voiced by Diedrich Bader) is a genetically enhanced, muscular lab rat who is the leader of the rats that reside in the sewers. He constantly torments the penguins and never learns his lesson when he is defeated each time, although his raw strength often requires them to resort to less direct measures to defeat him. He even tries to take over their home, but is beaten by King Julien in an ice hockey game.
 Officer X (voiced by Cedric Yarbrough) is an animal control officer. He is obsessed with catching stray animals. He has a stronger grudge against the penguins than Alice. His first appearance is when he is searching for Max and the second appearance is when he was tracking down the penguins when they escaped the zoo. He is a very strong man and can take down even the strongest of animals, like Joey the Kangaroo. Officer X is very cocky and seems to have hunted many other animals before. In his second appearance he was arrested for going on a rampage after losing the penguins. He was an exterminator hired to remove cockroaches that Rico had befriended in "Stop Bugging Me" and a temporary zookeeper when Alice went on vacation in "The Officer X Factor". In the episode "A Kipper for Skipper" he is shown to be a fishmonger and manages to capture Kowalski, Private and Rico. But as in the other times they manage to escape, even though he was close to catch Kowalski in his obsession. And again he gets in trouble with the law.
 Savio (voiced by Nestor Carbonell) is an enormous, sly and powerful green anaconda (usually merely referred to as a boa constrictor), and one of the penguins' most dangerous enemies. He speaks with a Spanish accent and enjoys eating small mammals. Savio appears in the episodes "The Big Squeeze" and "All Tied Up With A Boa". He also appears in "The Hoboken Surprise" and "The Terror of Madagascar".

Production 
In mid-2006, Nickelodeon and DreamWorks Animation announced that they would collaborate to create a show based on the Madagascar films. The new series would star the penguins from the film series. Nothing was confirmed on what the series would be about until November 2007.

At first, in November 2007, Nickelodeon advertised a sneak peek of three new Nicktoons coming to Nickelodeon, The Mighty B!, Making Fiends, and The Penguins of Madagascar all on November 25, 2007, as part of Superstuffed Nicktoons Weekend. Then, in December 2007, Nickelodeon advertised many events that were going to premiere in 2008 (The Mighty B!, Fairly OddBaby, The Penguins of Madagascar, KCA 2008, Sidekicks (The Naked Brothers Band), and "Pest of the West"). Since then, The Penguins of Madagascar premiere was delayed at least twice in 2008. It was most likely delayed to make room for the release of Madagascar: Escape 2 Africa on November 7, 2008. On November 28, 2008, Nickelodeon aired an episode from the series as a sneak peek. The series officially debuted 4 months later on March 28, 2009 at 9:30 pm ET/PT. The Double DVD Pack edition of Madagascar: Escape 2 Africa released on February 6, 2009 included an unaired episode of the show called "Popcorn Panic". This episode officially aired on TV 3 months later on May 9, 2009. On December 24, 2013, new episodes of the series were moved to the Nicktoons channel.

The series was co-produced by DreamWorks Animation and the Nickelodeon Animation Studio's Burbank location. Animation services were outsourced to India, New Zealand and Taiwan. The producers were planning on a 26-episode first season, but the episode number was changed to 48.

Casting 
Some of the voice actors who voiced the characters in the films were unable to reprise their roles for the series. Chris Miller, who had voiced Kowalski, was replaced by Jeff Bennett, while Christopher Knights was replaced by James Patrick Stuart for the voice of Private. Danny Jacobs took over from Sacha Baron Cohen as the voice of King Julien, and Cedric the Entertainer's character, Maurice, is now voiced by Kevin Michael Richardson. Tom McGrath, John DiMaggio, Andy Richter and Conrad Vernon reprised their roles of Skipper, Rico, Mort, and Mason for the TV series, respectively. Other characters are voiced by the same actors who had voiced them in the films, while some characters, like Marlene and Alice the zookeeper, are new characters created especially for the series.

Broadcast

Nickelodeon debut 
The Penguins of Madagascar aired on Nickelodeon after the 2009 Kids' Choice Awards on March 28, 2009.

International 
In Australia, The Penguins of Madagascar premiered on April 18, 2009 on Nickelodeon.  In Canada, the series premiered on September 12, 2009 on Nickelodeon Canada and YTV. In Ireland, the series premiered on Nickelodeon Ireland and RTÉ Two on April 12, 2009.  The series debuted in New Zealand April 18, 2009 on Nickelodeon (Australia and New Zealand). In the United Kingdom, the series premiered April 12, 2009 on Nickelodeon (UK and Ireland), CITV, and Viva.  Nickelodeon aired a "sneak peek" preview of The Penguins of Madagascar in the United States November 28, 2008, and officially launched the series March 28, 2009. The series was added to Hulu in June 2018. The series premiered on Duronto TV in Bangladesh on March 1, 2021, alongside Kung Fu Panda: Legends of Awesomeness.

Critical reception 

Mary McNamara of the Los Angeles Times gave The Penguins of Madagascar a favorable review. She said that the show had strong comedic timing and action scenes, saying that it recalled both Wile E. Coyote cartoons and 1940s gangster movies. Tim Goodman's review in the San Francisco Chronicle is also favorable. He said that he considered the penguins and Julien as having the most comedic potential from the movies, with his review focusing on the voice actors' comedic timing, and said that the show also contained several jokes that would make it appealing to adults.

Brian Lowry of Variety described the show as "loud, exuberant and colorful" and praised its animation quality, but he did not think that it was funny and said that the show seemed more like a "merchandising bonanza".

Awards and recognition

Toys 
DreamWorks licensed a number of manufacturers to create products for the show, including Hooga Loo Toys, which had a successful run creating a line of plush toys associated with the second Madagascar movie. Based on its success, Hooga Loo was granted a license to create an entirely new toy line for the new series. Hooga Loo recruited the creative development team, Pangea Corporation, the company who assisted Playmates Toys in the development of the very successful Teenage Mutant Ninja Turtles, to work systemically with DreamWorks and develop toys inspired by the series. The toy line included a full range of plush characters, as well as collectible figures and wacky vehicles. Fast food restaurants courted DreamWorks to glean the rights for a QSR deal, which finally materialized in late 2009. McDonald's had produced a line of toys based on the second film. This relationship forged a new deal with McDonald's.

Licensed merchandise based on the show began debuting in January 2010. In February 2010, McDonald's began their "Mission: Play" Happy Meal toy campaign, which featured eight toys based on the penguins in the series.

Video games 
 The Penguins of Madagascar video game is a Nintendo DS action-adventure game based on the TV show of the same name. The game was released by THQ on November 2, 2010, and was developed by Griptonite Games.
 The Penguins of Madagascar: Dr. Blowhole Returns – Again! was released by THQ on September 6, 2011, for Wii, Xbox 360, PlayStation 3, and Nintendo DS.

References

External links 

 
 The Penguins of Madagascar on Paramount+
 
 The Penguins of Madagascar at NickAnimationStudio.com (archive)

Madagascar (franchise)
2000s Nickelodeon original programming
2010s Nickelodeon original programming
2000s American animated television series
2010s American animated television series
2008 American television series debuts
2015 American television series endings
American children's animated action television series
American children's animated adventure television series
American children's animated comedy television series
American children's animated fantasy television series
Animated television shows based on films
American computer-animated television series
Television series by DreamWorks Animation
Television series about parallel universes
Animated television series about penguins
Nicktoons
Television shows set in New York City
Annie Award winners
Daytime Emmy Award for Outstanding Animated Program winners
English-language television shows
Emmy Award-winning programs
American animated television spin-offs